Donald Trump, the 45th president of the United States, was impeached for the second time on January 13, 2021, one week before his term expired. It was the fourth impeachment of a U.S. president, and the second for Trump after his first impeachment in December 2019. Ten Republican representatives voted for the second impeachment, the most pro-impeachment votes ever from a president's party. This was also the first presidential impeachment in which the majority caucus voted unanimously for impeachment.

The House of Representatives of the 117th U.S. Congress adopted one article of impeachment against Trump of "incitement of insurrection", stating that he had incited the January 6 attack of the U.S. Capitol. These events were preceded by attempts by Trump to overturn the 2020 presidential election, as well as his pushing of voter fraud conspiracy theories on his social media channels before, during, and after the election. A single article of impeachment charging Trump with "incitement of insurrection" against the U.S. government and "lawless action at the Capitol" was introduced to the House of Representatives on January 11, 2021. The article was introduced with more than 200 co-sponsors. The same day, House Speaker Nancy Pelosi gave Vice President Mike Pence an ultimatum to invoke Section 4 of the 25th Amendment to assume the role of acting president within 24 hours, or the House would proceed with impeachment proceedings. Pence said that he would not do so in a letter to Pelosi the following day, arguing that to do so would not "be in the best interest of our Nation or consistent with our Constitution". Nevertheless, a House majority, including Republican Adam Kinzinger, passed a resolution urging Pence to invoke the 25th Amendment.

The House impeachment managers formally triggered the start of the impeachment trial on January 25 by delivering to the Senate the charge against Trump. The nine managers walked into the Senate chamber led by the lead impeachment manager, Representative Jamie Raskin, who read the article of impeachment. The trial in the Senate was scheduled to start on February 9. The trial was the first of its kind for a departed U.S. president, with Andrew Johnson, Bill Clinton, and Trump having each been the incumbent in prior impeachment trials; as a result, Chief Justice John Roberts chose not to preside as he had done for Trump's first impeachment trial (the president pro tempore of the Senate, Vermont senator Patrick Leahy, presided instead), and arguments favoring the conviction of Trump cited the Senate's 1876 conviction of Ulysses S. Grant's Secretary of War William W. Belknap, who was impeached, but was not convicted, after leaving office. At the trial, 57 senators voted "guilty", which was less than the two-thirds majority needed (67) to convict Trump, and 43 senators voted "not guilty", resulting in Trump being acquitted of the charges on February 13, 2021.

Background

Attempts to overturn the 2020 election 

For weeks prior to the impeachment, President Trump made numerous unsuccessful attempts to overturn the 2020 United States presidential election.

January 6 U.S. Capitol attack 

Trump told his supporters to come to Washington D.C. on January 6, the day Congress was counting the electoral votes, to the "March to Save America" rally at  The Ellipse. During the rally, Trump as well as other speakers falsely claimed that the election was stolen, used the word "fight", made an analogy to boxing, and suggested that his supporters had the power to prevent President-elect Joe Biden from taking office.

When the United States Congress convened to certify the electoral votes of the presidential election, supporters of Trump crossed the Mall and stormed the United States Capitol in an attempt to prevent the tabulation of votes and protest against Biden's win. Trump supporters illegally entered the Capitol and gathered on its eastern and western sides, including on the inaugural platform constructed for Biden's inauguration. Five people, including a Capitol Police officer, died from the riots, while several improvised explosive devices were found on and near the Capitol grounds. Another Capitol police officer on duty during the riots died by suicide days later. During the riots, Trump was "initially pleased" by the attack on the Capitol and took no action. In a speech hours into the event, Trump told the rioters "We love you. You're very special," restated his false claims of electoral fraud, and then asked them to go home. Hours later, Congress reconvened and ultimately certified the electoral votes in the early morning hours of January 7. Trump then released a statement asserting that there would be an "orderly transition" of power on Inauguration Day, even while continuing to claim falsely that the election was stolen from him and also stating that he would not attend Biden's inauguration.

Considered scenarios
Four scenarios for the removal of Trump from office had been posited by members of Congress, members of Trump's cabinet, political commentators, or legal scholars: resignation, the invocation of the 14th Amendment, invocation of the 25th Amendment, or impeachment and conviction.

Resignation 

The President of the United States can resign from office, in which case the Vice President will automatically become president, instead of merely assuming the powers and duties of the presidency as acting president. While Article II of the Constitution states that the "Powers and Duties" of the president devolve to the vice president in the event of the president's death, resignation, incapacity, or removal, John Tyler interpreted that provision as allowing the Vice President to ascend to the presidency in such cases, without any qualifications. This practice was codified in 1967, with the passage of the 25th Amendment.

If Trump had resigned, Vice President Mike Pence would have become the 46th president of the United States; Pence would have been the shortest-serving president ever, being in office for a matter of days before handing power to Joe Biden as the 47th president on January 20. This would have surpassed the record of William Henry Harrison, who died 31 days into his term. It would have been the second time in history that a president would be forced to resign; the first was the 1974 resignation of Richard Nixon when it appeared inevitable that he would be impeached and removed from office for his role in the Watergate scandal.

Due to intense pressure on his administration, the threat of removal, and numerous resignations, Trump committed to an orderly transition of power in a televised speech on January 7. In the White House on January 8, Trump mentioned that he was not considering resignation. On January 9, The New York Times reported that Trump told White House aides that he regretted his statement committing to an orderly transition of power and that there was no chance he would resign from office.

14th Amendment 
The Fourteenth Amendment to the United States Constitution is one of the Reconstruction Amendments. It addresses citizenship rights and equal protection under the law and was proposed in response to issues related to former slaves following the American Civil War. Section 3 states that a person who participated in insurrection after having taken an oath to support the Constitution is disqualified from holding future office unless permitted by Congress.

If Trump had been removed from office under Section 3 of the 14th Amendment, Pence would have become the 46th president of the United States, and he would still have been the shortest-serving president ever before handing power to Biden as the 47th president on January 20. It would also be the first time that Section 3 of the 14th Amendment was invoked since 1919 when it stopped Victor L. Berger, convicted of violating the Espionage Act for his anti-militarist views, from taking his seat in the House of Representatives. It would also be the first time that it would be invoked on a sitting president and was seen as especially unlikely.

Alexandria Ocasio-Cortez was one of the House Democrats that supported invoking the 14th Amendment against Trump. In a letter, Pelosi thanked her colleagues for their contributions to discussions on the 14th Amendment. If successful, the former President would be ineligible for appointment to any federal office without a Senate supermajority vote in favor.

25th Amendment
The Twenty-fifth Amendment to the United States Constitution deals with presidential succession and disability. Though the amendment thus far has been used in medical situations, Section 4 provides that the vice president, together with a majority of Cabinet secretaries, may declare the president unable to carry out his duties, after which the vice president immediately assumes the duties of the president.

If Section 4 of the 25th Amendment action had been carried out, it would have made Pence the acting president, assuming the "powers and duties of the office" of the president. Trump would have remained president for the rest of his term, albeit stripped of all authority. Section 4 of the 25th Amendment has not been invoked before. The 25th Amendment, however, was initially created for the case where the President was incapacitated.

Pence, who would have been required to initiate removal, stated that he would not invoke the 25th Amendment against Trump.

Impeachment and conviction 

Impeachment begins in the House of Representatives, where articles of impeachment are drawn up. These articles are then voted on by House members. Each article is voted on separately and requires a simple majority to pass. Once an article has been passed in the House, the president has been impeached. The articles are then sent to the Senate for adjudication with an impeachment trial. After views have been laid out in the trial, the Senate moves to vote on conviction. Each article requires a two-thirds majority of Senators present to pass. If an article passes in the Senate, the president has been convicted and is removed from office. Once the president is convicted, a further vote may then be held which determines whether the (now-former) president is barred from holding future office; this vote passes with a simple majority in the Senate.

Because the Senate was not scheduled to reconvene until January 19, 2021, members of Congress discussed holding the trial after Trump had left office. A former president had never been tried by the Senate; however, Secretary of War William W. Belknap was impeached by the House and tried by the Senate after he had resigned.

Invoking the 25th Amendment 

On the evening of January 6, CBS News reported that Cabinet members were discussing invoking the 25th Amendment. The ten Democrats on the House Judiciary Committee, led by U.S. Representative David Cicilline, sent a letter to Pence to "emphatically urge" him to invoke the 25th Amendment and declare Trump "unable to discharge the powers and duties of his office", claiming that he incited and condoned the riots. For invocation, Pence and at least eight Cabinet members, forming a simple majority, would have to consent. Additionally, if challenged by Trump, the second invocation would maintain Pence as acting president, subject to a vote of approval in both houses of Congress, with a two-thirds supermajority necessary in each chamber to sustain. However, Congress would not have needed to act before January 20 for Pence to remain acting president until Biden was inaugurated, per the timeline described in Section 4.

Senator Elizabeth Warren (D–MA) accused Education Secretary Betsy DeVos in a tweet of quitting rather than supporting efforts to invoke the 25th Amendment to remove Trump. A Trump administration official disputed Warren's claim. House majority whip Jim Clyburn on Friday accused DeVos and Transportation Secretary Elaine Chao of "running away from their responsibility" by resigning from President Trump's Cabinet before invoking the 25th Amendment to remove him from office. News agencies reported that DeVos was in discussions to invoke the 25th Amendment prior to her resignation. By late January 9, it was reported that Pence had not ruled out invoking the 25th Amendment and was actively considering it.

The House Rules Committee met on January 12, 2021, to vote on a non-binding resolution calling on Pence to invoke the 25th Amendment. Pence later reiterated his position of not invoking the 25th Amendment, according to a letter sent to Pelosi late on January 12. In it, he stated that the 25th Amendment was intended for presidential incapacity or disability, and invoking Section 4 to punish and usurp President Trump in the middle of a presidential transition would undermine and set a terrible precedent for the stability of the executive branch and the United States federal government.

On the same day, the House of Representatives voted to call for Pence to invoke the 25th Amendment. The resolution passed with 223 in favor, 205 against, and 5 (all Republicans) not voting; Adam Kinzinger was the only Republican to join a unified Democratic Caucus.

Raskin bill
The 25th Amendment allows Congress to establish a committee to determine when a president is unfit to serve (section 4 of the Amendment provides that the "declaration that the President is unable to discharge the powers and duties of his office" is made by "the Vice President and a majority of either the principal officers of the executive departments [i.e., the Cabinet] or of such other body as Congress may by law provide"). However, such a committee has never been established. In May 2017, Representative Jamie Raskin (D–MD-8) introduced legislation to create a standing, independent, nonpartisan body, called the Oversight Commission on Presidential Capacity, to make such a determination. The bill had 20 cosponsors. Raskin had previously introduced a legislative proposal under the same title with the same purpose back in 2017.

In October 2020, Raskin and Pelosi introduced a similar bill to create a Commission on Presidential Capacity to Discharge the Powers and Duties of Office, to have 17 membersfour physicians, four psychiatrists, four retired Democratic statespersons, and four retired Republican statespersons appointed by congressional leaders (the Speaker of the House, House Minority Leader, Senate Majority Leader, and Senate Minority Leader). The bill defines "retired statespersons" as former presidents, vice presidents, attorneys general, secretaries of state, defense secretaries, Treasury secretaries, and surgeons general. The committee chair would be appointed by the other members. The bill provides that no members of the commission could be a current elected official, federal employee, or active or reserve military personnel, a measure intended to avoid conflicts of interest and chain-of-command problems. A majority of the commission (nine members), plus the vice president, would need to support invoking the 25th Amendment. The bill had 38 cosponsors. While the bill has received renewed interest since the Capitol incident, as with any other bill it would require passage by both houses of Congress and consideration by the president for the commission to be formed and consider invocation of Section 4.

Impeachment

Drafted articles of impeachment 

Within hours of the Capitol attack, members of Congress began to call for the impeachment of Donald Trump as president. Several representatives began the process of independently drafting various articles of impeachment. Of these attempts, the first to become public were those of Representative Ilhan Omar (D–MN-5) who drafted and introduced articles of impeachment against Trump.

Representative David Cicilline (D–RI-1) separately drafted an article of impeachment. The text was obtained by CNN on January 8. On Twitter, Cicilline acknowledged the coauthorship of Ted Lieu and Jamie Raskin, and said that "more than 110" members had signed on to this article. "Article I: Incitement of Insurrection" accuses Trump of having "willfully made statements that encouraged—and foreseeably resulted in—imminent lawless action at the Capitol". As a result of incitement by Trump, "a mob unlawfully breached the Capitol" and "engaged in violent, deadly, destructive, and seditious acts". On January 10, it was announced that the bill had gathered 210 cosponsors in the House.

Article of impeachment introduced 

On January 11, 2021, U.S. Representatives David Cicilline, along with Jamie Raskin and Ted Lieu, introduced an article of impeachment against Trump, charging Trump with "incitement of insurrection" in urging his supporters to march on the Capitol building. The article contended that Trump made several statements that "encouraged—and foreseeably resulted in—lawless action" that interfered with Congress' constitutional duty to certify the election. It argued that by his actions, Trump "threatened the integrity of the democratic system, interfered with the peaceful transition of power, and imperiled a coequal branch of Government", doing so in a way that rendered him "a threat to national security, democracy, and the Constitution" if he were allowed to complete his term. By the time it was introduced, 218 of the 222 House Democrats had signed on as cosponsors, assuring its passage. Trump was impeached in a vote on January 13, 2021; ten Republicans, including House Republican Conference chairwoman Liz Cheney, joined all of the Democrats in supporting the article.

On January 12, with the article's passage assured, Pelosi named Raskin, Lieu, Cicilline, Diana DeGette, Joaquin Castro, Eric Swalwell, Joe Neguse, Madeleine Dean, and Stacey Plaskett as managers to present the prosecution case in the Senate conviction trial, with Raskin as lead manager. The managers were chosen for their expertise in constitutional law, civil rights, and criminal justice. Raskin is a former constitutional law professor at American University. Lieu is a former military prosecutor in the United States Air Force. Cicilline is a former public defender. Swalwell was a former prosecutor in California. DeGette is a former civil rights attorney. Castro, Neguse, Dean and Plaskett are all lawyers in private practice.

The House impeachment managers formally triggered the start of the impeachment trial on January 25 by walking across the Capitol and delivered to the Senate the charge against Trump. The nine managers were led into the Senate chamber by the lead impeachment manager, who read the article of impeachment. The trial in the Senate began as scheduled on February 9.

House vote

Senate trial

Opinions

Support 
People from media and political organizations have expressed support for Trump to be either impeached or removed through the methods outlined in the 25th Amendment. Any impeachment by the House of Representatives would, for removal, require a trial and conviction in the Senate, with the concurrence of two-thirds of Senators present and voting, during which time Trump would remain in office. As of January 8, the extent of support among Senators for an impeachment process is unclear, particularly given the length of time necessary to organize a trial and the short duration remaining of Trump's presidency. Poll aggregate website FiveThirtyEight said that roughly 85% of Democrats, 49% of Independents, and 16% of Republicans supported impeachment.  The site also found roughly an 8% drop in Trump's approval ratings following the attack.

Federal elected officials 
At least 200 members of Congress have called for Trump to be impeached or stripped of his powers and duties under the 25th Amendment. Other House members, as well as several state officials, have called for Trump's immediate removal by Congress under the 25th Amendment. On January 6, four "senior Republican elected officials" told CNN that they believe Trump should be removed via the 25th Amendment, while two other Republican elected officials said Trump should be removed by impeachment. On January 11, 24 former Republican members of Congress came out in support of impeachment.

House Democrats 
The day of the attack, many House Democrats, including Seth Moulton, Alexandria Ocasio-Cortez, and Katherine Clark, called for Trump's immediate impeachment and removal by Congress, or via the 25th Amendment. Speaker of the United States House of Representatives Nancy Pelosi, a Democrat, urged the removal of Trump via the 25th Amendment, and announced she was prepared to vote on articles of impeachment if this does not happen. Pelosi said Trump is "a very dangerous person who should not continue in office". In vowing to impeach Trump again if his cabinet does not remove him themselves, Pelosi said Trump "incited an armed insurrection against America" and that "the gleeful desecration of the U.S. Capitol, which is the temple of our American democracy, and the violence targeting Congress are horrors that will forever stain our nation's historyinstigated by the president."

On January 6, Representatives Ted Lieu and Charlie Crist called on Vice President Mike Pence to remove Trump via the 25th Amendment.

House Republicans 
The first House Republican to call outright for Trump's removal from office was Adam Kinzinger; he tweeted in favor of the 25th Amendment the day after the riot.

On January 8, CNN reported that two unnamed Republican members of the House said they would consider voting for impeachment. One said: "We experienced the attack; we don't need long hearings on what happened." Subsequently, Kinzinger, as well as John Katko, Liz Cheney, Jaime Herrera Beutler, Fred Upton, and Dan Newhouse indicated they would vote in favor of impeachment; other House Republicans openly considering voting for impeachment included Peter Meijer (as of a January 11 statement). Anthony Gonzalez posted a statement expressing support for impeachment to Twitter during the vote. Ultimately, ten Republicans voted to impeach, including Katko, Kinzinger, Upton, Beutler, Newhouse, Meijer, Cheney and Gonzalez, as well as David Valadao of California and Tom Rice of South Carolina. Four Republicans did not vote. Liz Cheney released a strong statement in support of the impeachment, which was also prominently quoted in the closing argument by House majority leader Steny Hoyer, stating that "the president of the United States summoned this mob, assembled the mob, and lit the flame of this attack. Everything that followed was his doing. (...) There has never been a greater betrayal by a President of the United States of his office and his oath to the Constitution." Later the Wyoming GOP demanded for Cheney, the third highest ranking Republican in the House, to resign from her post. She refused to do so, and corrected members of her state party who had said that the Capitol rioting was done by antifa and Black Lives Matter protesters.

Senate Democrats 
By January 7, Democrat Chuck Schumer, the Senate Minority Leader, had called for Trump's immediate removal from office, as had many other Democratic members of the U.S. Senate, such as Elizabeth Warren, Tim Kaine, and Amy Klobuchar.

On Monday, January 11, Senator Joe Manchin (D-WV) said that he thought the plan to vote on impeachment that week was "ill-advised" since there was no path to conviction by the Senate. He said Congress could move forward with impeachment after the inauguration of President-elect Biden.

Senate Republicans 
On January 8, Republican senator Ben Sasse said he was willing to consider an impeachment because Trump had violated his oath of office.

As of January 9, no Republican senators were publicly calling for Trump's removal from office, according to CNN. However, two Republican senators have called for his voluntary resignation. On January 8, Republican senator Lisa Murkowski of Alaska called on Trump to resign immediately, stating: "I want him out. He has caused enough damage." Murkowski suggested that she might declare herself an Independent, as, "if the Republican Party has become nothing more than the party of Trump, I sincerely question whether this is the party for me." Republican senator Pat Toomey of Pennsylvania stated on January 9 that he thinks President Trump "committed impeachable offenses" and that his Republican colleagues should be "soul searching" about their own involvement, but he didn't say how he plans to vote if the matter comes to a Senate trial. On January 10, Toomey said that "the best way for our country" would be for Trump "to resign and go away as soon as possible".

After Senate Majority Leader Mitch McConnell acknowledged Biden's victory on December 15, Trump did not speak to McConnell for the remaining month of his presidency. McConnell reportedly believed that Trump had committed impeachable crimes; on Trump's last full day in office, McConnell said that "the mob was fed lies" and that "they were provoked by the president." While McConnell was also said to believe that an impeachment proceeding would make it easier for Republicans to purge Trump's influence from the party, he nevertheless told fellow senators on January 13 that he had not yet decided whether he would vote to convict Trump and that he would listen to the arguments during the trial. Furthermore, McConnell was unwilling to convene the Senate early to hold the trial, entailing that Trump finished his presidential term.

State elected officials

Current governors and lieutenant governors 
The following governors and lieutenant governors said that Trump should be removed from office:
 California Governor Gavin Newsom (Democratic)
 Illinois Governor J. B. Pritzker (Democratic)
 Maryland Governor Larry Hogan (Republican)
 Maryland Lieutenant Governor Boyd Rutherford (Republican)
 Massachusetts Governor Charlie Baker (Republican)
 New York Governor Andrew Cuomo (Democratic)
 New Jersey Governor Phil Murphy (Democratic)
 North Carolina Governor Roy Cooper (Democratic)
 Pennsylvania Governor Tom Wolf (Democratic)
 Vermont Governor Phil Scott (Republican)
 Virginia Governor Ralph Northam (Democratic)
 Washington Governor Jay Inslee (Democratic)

Former governors 
 Former California Governor Arnold Schwarzenegger (Republican)
 Former New Jersey Governor Chris Christie (Republican)
 Former Massachusetts Governor Bill Weld (Republican)
 Former Massachusetts Governor Mitt Romney (Republican)
 Former Ohio Governor John Kasich (Republican)

Administration positions

Federal employees 
About 175 career diplomats in the State Department, mostly lawyers, called on Mike Pompeo to support consultations with other cabinet officials on possibly invoking the 25th Amendment to remove the president from office. The cable stated that the president's actions undermined U.S. foreign policy and democratic institutions.

Former administration officials 
Former Secretary of Homeland Security and White House Chief of Staff John F. Kelly, who left Trump's Cabinet in 2019, said that if he had still been part of the administration during the attack, he would have supported Trump's removal from office.

Historians, scholars, and commentators 
More than 1,000 historians and constitutional scholars signed an open letter, posted online on January 11, 2021, calling for Trump to be impeached and removed from office.  Additionally, the American Constitution Society published a statement signed by over 900 law professors calling for Congress to impeach and remove Trump from office, or for Vice President Pence and the Cabinet invoke the 25th Amendment.

Yoni Appelbaum (The Atlantic), David French (Time), Austin Sarat, David Frum (The Atlantic), Tom Nichols (USA Today), David Landau, Rosalind Dixon, and Bret Stephens (The New York Times) called for the impeachment of Trump the second time and for him to be disqualified from public office. Mary L. Trump, the President's niece, said she thought her uncle should be barred from ever running for office again.

Several conservative commentators, including Meghan McCain, Rod Dreher, Daniel Larison (The American Conservative), John Podhoretz (Commentary), Tiana Lowe and Eddie Scarry (Washington Examiner) expressed their support for the impeachment and/or the invocation of the 25th Amendment to remove Trump from office. Matthew Continetti, writing in the National Review, also called for Trump's removal from office. Fox News analyst Juan Williams wrote in The Hill, "Arrest the rioters; impeach Trump".

Progressive commentators John Nichols (The Nation) and Matt Ford (The New Republic) also called for Trump to be impeached and permanently disqualified from public office.

Calling the attack an "act of sedition", The Washington Post editorial board wrote that Trump's "continued tenure in office poses a grave threat to U.S. democracy" as well as to public order and national security, and called for Pence to immediately begin the 25th Amendment process to declare Trump "unable to discharge the powers and duties of his office" so that Pence could serve until Biden's inauguration on January 20. In its first-ever staff editorial, The Dispatch stated that Trump "must be removed" for abusing his office, violating the public trust, and inciting "a violent attack on the Capitol and Congress". The Financial Times editorial board called for Trump to be "held accountable for storming the Capitol". The Wall Street Journal editorial board invited Trump to resign, calling his acts "impeachable" and saying that the President had "crossed a constitutional line that Mr. Trump hasn’t previously crossed".

Other organizations 
The Lincoln Project, a political action committee formed by anti-Trump Republicans and former Republicans, called for the House of Representatives and the Senate to "immediately impeach Donald Trump for directing and provoking this attack".

The National Association of Manufacturers also requested Pence to "seriously consider" invoking the 25th Amendment.

Freedom House issued a press release calling for the immediate removal of President Trump, through resignation, the 25th Amendment, or impeachment.

The American Civil Liberties Union called for Trump's impeachment for the second time.

March for Science circulated an online petition calling for Trump to be removed immediately via the 25th Amendment.

Crowell & Moring LLP, a large Washington, D.C., law firm, circulated a letter among the nation's largest law firms calling for Trump's removal under Section 4 of the Constitution's 25th Amendment. At least 18 other law firms, including DLA Piper, Foley Hoag, and Hanson Bridgett joined this call.

Opposition

Senators 
On January 7, Senator Steve Daines (R-MT) said "These calls for impeachment I'm hearing -- I don't think they're helpful, and I think we should allow 13 days to move forward peacefully and prepare for this transition of power that's going to happen on Jan. 20."

On January 8, Senator Lindsey Graham (R–SC) tweeted that impeachment "will do more harm than good". In a follow-up tweet, he implied that Pelosi and Schumer wanted to impeach Trump because they were concerned about their own political survival. Also, on January 11, Graham tweeted "It is past time for all of us to try to heal our country and move forward. Impeachment would be a major step backward."

On January 11, three senators spoke out against impeachment. Senator Cindy Hyde-Smith (R-MS) said "Let's get through the 10 days. He will leave the office and let's get on with things." Senator John Hoeven (R-ND) said "We need to work together to heal the divisions in our nation and impeachment would instead serve to further divide our country." Senator Rick Scott (R-FL) said "I'm not going to do what the Democrats are doing. I think we need to lower the rhetoric. We need to get some unity going."

On January 12, Senator Tim Scott (R-SC) tweeted "An impeachment vote will only lead to more hate and a deeply fractured nation. I oppose impeaching President Trump."

On January 13, seven senators spoke out against impeachment. Senator Bill Hagerty (R-TN) said "At a time when the United States needs national healing and a true commitment to the rule of law, the American people should look to their legislators not to deepen partisan division, but to bring us together. There are seven days to go in the President's term, and he has fully committed to a peaceful transfer of power." Senator Cynthia Lummis (R-WY) said "Moving forward with impeachment at this juncture will only further divide our already hurting nation." Senator Kevin Cramer (R-ND) said: "The president's rhetoric, while reckless, while at some level could be accused of inciting anger and inciting some bad behavior, it is also clear that the exact words that he used do not rise to, in my mind anyway, a criminal level of incitement as we would have to consider, in my view, in this process even as political as it is." Senator Marsha Blackburn (R-TN) said "To persist with impeachment now, with just days to go in the current administration, will further divide Americans and exacerbate tensions. Moving forward, it is my sincere hope Congress will work on a bipartisan basis to restore the confidence of the American people in our elections and affirm our shared commitment to the rule of law." Senator Roger Wicker (R-MS) told the Meridian Star on Jan 13 that he opposes impeachment. Senator Tom Cotton (R-AR) said: "After January 20, Congress should get on with the people’s business: improving our vaccination efforts, getting kids back to school, and getting workers back on the job." Senator Tommy Tuberville (R-AL) said "We just need to go forward to help the people of this country and quit worrying about politics."

On January 14, Senator Mike Rounds (R-SD) said "I think if the question is 
moot, I don't see a reason to convict."

On January 19, three senators spoke out against impeachment. Senator John Cornyn (R-TX) said "If they proceed with the impeachment trial, I think that will further divide the country." Senator John Thune (R-SD) said, "In my view, using a constitutional tool designed to remove the president from office after he has already left could further divide our country when we can least afford it." Senator Roger Marshall (R-KS) said "Not only is it unconstitutional to impeach a President after he leaves office, I firmly believe an impeachment effort at this juncture will only raise already heated temperatures of the American public and further divide our country at a time when we should be focused on bringing the country together and moving forward. Whether it's getting the COVID-19 vaccine into the arms of all those who want and need it, boosting job recovery, or opening our economy back up to pre-pandemic levels, we have real work to do."

On January 20, Senator John Boozman (R-AR) said "With [Trump] already being gone, impeachment would be a significant expense and waste of time."

On January 21, five senators spoke out against impeachment. Senator Chuck Grassley (R-IA) said "It's one thing, according to the constitution, to impeach a president, but can you impeach a citizen? Because now it's not President Trump, it's citizen Trump." Senator Josh Hawley (R-MO) said "Democrats appear intent on weaponizing every tool at their disposal — including pushing an unconstitutional impeachment process — to further divide the country. Missourians will not be canceled by these partisan attacks." Senator Mike Braun (R-IN) said "I think the key point is, is it constitutional to do this when somebody is out of office — and then, is it purely retribution when you try to push it forward." Senator Ron Johnson (R-WI) said "I believe an impeachment trial of a former president is unconstitutional and would set a very dangerous precedent." Senator Ted Cruz (R-TX) said ""It seems that Senate Democrats, the response they have to that is they want to start the new Congress the very first thing, with a vindictive and punitive impeachment trial,"

On January 24, two senators spoke out against impeachment. Senator John Barrasso (R-WY) said Democrats were sending a message that "hatred and vitriol of Donald Trump are so strong" that they will hold a trial that stops Biden's policy priorities from moving. Senator Marco Rubio (R-FL) said "The first chance I get to vote to end this trial, I will do it, because I think it's really bad for America."

On January 25, three senators spoke out against impeachment. Senator Joni Ernst (R-IA) said "My concern right now is that the president is no longer in office. Congress would be opening itself to a dangerous standard of using impeachment as a tool for political revenge against a private citizen, and the only remedy at this point is to strip the convicted of their ability to run for future office – a move that would undoubtedly strip millions of voters of their ability to choose a candidate in the next election." Senator Rand Paul (R-KY) tweeted "I object to this unconstitutional sham of an 'impeachment' trial and I will force a vote on whether the Senate can hold a trial of a private citizen." Senator Richard Burr (R-NC) said "A charge like this should go to the Justice Department and be referred for prosecution. Unfortunately, that's not what they're doing," However, Burr ended up voting to convict Trump for the charges on incitement of insurrection.

On January 26, eight senators spoke out against impeachment. Senator James Lankford (R-OK) said "This is not a trial; this is political theater. You cannot remove someone from the office who is already out of office. In this trial, there is no current President, no Chief Justice, and no possibility someone could be removed from office because they are not in any office. In a moment when our nation needs to unite, this trial will only create even deeper divisions." Senator Jim Inhofe (R-OK) tweeted "Given that the penalty for impeachment shall be removed from office, my reading of the Constitution leads me to believe that the Founders did not intend for us to impeach former federal officeholders. I agree with @RandPaul that it's not constitutional to try a former president." Senator John Kennedy (R-LA) said "Today, I voted to affirm that these impeachment proceedings are unconstitutional. Based on the information I have right now, I voted today and will vote again later in the impeachment trial to dismiss the impeachment proceedings against former President Trump." Senator Rand Paul (R-KY) tweeted "This impeachment is nothing more than a partisan exercise designed to further divide the country. Democrats claim to want to unify the country but impeaching a former president, a private citizen, is the antithesis of unity." Senator Richard Shelby (R-AL) told reporters he has "deep reservations whether they should be trying him at all." Senator Roy Blunt (R-MO) tweeted that "I believe the constitutional purpose for presidential impeachment is to remove a president from office, not to punish a person after they have left office." Senator Shelley Moore Capito (R-WV) said "My vote today to dismiss the article of impeachment is based on the fact that impeachment was designed to remove an officeholder from public office. The Constitution does not give Congress the power to impeach a private citizen. This charge is directed at an individual who no longer holds public office. I believe it is time we focus our attention and energies on the numerous challenges our country presently faces. Instead of taking a path of divisiveness, let us heed the call to unity that we have heard spoken so often over the past few weeks." Senator Thom Tillis (R-NC) said "On January 6, I said voting to reject the states' electors was a dangerous precedent we should not set. Likewise, impeaching a former President who is now a private citizen would be equally unwise."

Senators Jim Risch (R-ID) was among a group of Republican senators who have asked Minority Leader Mitch McConnell (R-KY) how to prevent the Senate from even holding a trial.

Others 
Retired Harvard Law School professor Alan Dershowitz, who represented Trump during his first impeachment and had endorsed Biden for president in the 2020 election, opposed another impeachment. He stated that Trump "has not committed a constitutionally impeachable offense" and that he "would be honored to once again defend the Constitution against partisan efforts to weaponize it for political purposes".

George Washington University Law School professor Jonathan Turley wrote an op-ed in The Hill in which he argued that this new impeachment effort would "damage the constitution". While Turley condemns Trump's remarks, he stated that Trump's speech "would be viewed as a protected speech by the Supreme Court". He also noted that Trump "never actually called for violence or riots" and cited other remarks made by congressional Democrats the previous year that similarly encouraged protests that turned violent.

Former National Security Advisor John Bolton called for Trump's resignation; however, he argued against both invocation of the 25th Amendment and impeachment, saying that it was a "very bad idea", that the 25th Amendment was the "worst drafted" section of the Constitution, and would lead to "two competing presidencies" if invoked and challenged by Trump.

As a counter to the push for impeachment, House Republicans introduced a resolution to censure Trump, sponsored by Brian Fitzpatrick with original cosponsors Tom Reed, Young Kim, John Curtis, Peter Meijer, and Fred Upton; Meijer and Upton announced they would also support impeachment.

After the attack, Ohio Governor Mike DeWine said that impeachment was a poor idea, saying that "if that were to occur more people would be inflamed. There would be less trust in the whole system. We only got two more weeks and the next president will take place at 12 noon on January 20, two weeks to go and that will be it."

On January 12, Trump described the impeachment charge as a "witch hunt" that was "causing tremendous anger" among his supporters.

Public opinion polls 

RV = registered voters, LV = likely voters, A = all adults.

See also 

 Efforts to impeach Donald Trump
 Impeachment inquiry against Donald Trump - an impeachment inquiry preceding Trump's first impeachment
 First impeachment of Donald Trump
 First impeachment trial of Donald Trump
 Second impeachment trial of Donald Trump
 Republican reactions to Donald Trump's claims of 2020 election fraud
 Trump–Raffensperger phone call

Notes

References

External links 

 
 Article of impeachment published January 11, 2021 on Congress.gov
 Congressional Documents: Impeachment
  See also: 

 
January 2021 events in the United States
February 2021 events in the United States
Aftermath of the January 6 United States Capitol attack